Dustin Demri-Burns (born 11 July 1978) is a British actor, comedian and writer. He is best known for his work in Cardinal Burns.

He appeared in films as the roles of Danny Sinclair in the 2013 film Alan Partridge: Alpha Papa (2013), Viktor in the 2018 action comedy film The Spy Who Dumped Me (2018) and Crazy Cedric in the 2019 comedy film Horrible Histories: The Movie – Rotten Romans (2019).

In television, he appeared in shows as Julian in Stath Lets Flats, Will_5000 in Sick Note, Simon in GameFace, Daniel in Turn Up Charlie and Voltaire in The Great.

Early life
Demri-Burns was born in Lancaster, Lancashire on 11 July 1978. He attended Elliott School, Putney, Putney Heath, South West London (1989–96). He graduated from the London Academy of Music and Dramatic Art with a degree in acting.

Career
Demri-Burns started his acting career when he played a minor character in the 2003 short film Nightswimming (2003).

His film credits include The Spy Who Dumped Me, Bridget Jones' Baby, The Brothers Grimsby and Kill Your Friends.

He played the role of Danny Sinclair in the 2013 film Alan Partridge: Alpha Papa, featuring Steve Coogan, and has also played the role Cedric in the 2019 film Horrible Histories: The Movie - Rotten Romans. The same year, he also started in Abigail Blackmore's film Tales from the Lodge, alongside Kelly Wenham, Mackenzie Crook, Laura Fraser, Sophie Thompson and Johnny Vegas.

Along with his friend Sebastian Cardinal he created and produced the sketch comedy programme Cardinal Burns.

Demri-Burns has provided voices of characters in animation, such as the voice of Grumpy in Digby Dragon and as the UK voice of Tread in Bob the Builder.

In 2020, he played the role of Voltaire in an episode of the Hulu television series The Great, featuring Elle Fanning and Nicholas Hoult.

Personal life 
Demri-Burns is of French descent and currently resides in England with his wife and child.

Filmography

Film

Television

Video games

References

External links
 

1978 births
British male film actors
British male television actors
British male voice actors
British male comedians
British male writers
British people of French descent
21st-century British male actors
Alumni of the London Academy of Music and Dramatic Art
People from Lancaster, Lancashire
Living people